Andrew Cronic is an American football coach. He is the head football coach at Mercer University in Macon, Georgia, a position he assumed in December 2019. Cronic served as the head football coach at Reinhardt University in Waleska, Georgia from 2015 to 2016 and Lenoir–Rhyne University in Hickory, North Carolina from 2018 to 2019.

Head coaching record

References

External links
 Lenoir–Rhyne profile

Year of birth missing (living people)
Living people
American football wide receivers
Furman Paladins football coaches
Georgia Bulldogs football players
James Madison Dukes football coaches
Lenoir–Rhyne Bears football coaches
Mercer Bears football coaches
Reinhardt Eagles football coaches
West Georgia Wolves football coaches
University of West Georgia alumni
People from Coweta County, Georgia
Sportspeople from the Atlanta metropolitan area
Coaches of American football from Georgia (U.S. state)
Players of American football from Georgia (U.S. state)